Bradfield railway station served the village of Bradfield in Essex. It was on the Manningtree to Harwich branch line, which is today known as The Mayflower Line. It closed in 1956.
Consisting of just two through platforms it had no sidings for working local goods traffic, which was the normal scenario in rural East Anglia. The station buildings on the up platform were particularly splendid for a very small station and were captured by the well known and popular transport artist Malcolm Root FGRA. The facilities on the down platform were very modest by comparison. 
The station had a very restricted catchment area and with a local population of just 730 in 1901 and  811 in  1961, passenger numbers were always very limited.
A level crossing at the west end of the station was controlled by a signal box  on the up side with just 12 levers.

References

External links
 Bradfield station on navigable 1946 O. S. map

Disused railway stations in Essex
Former Great Eastern Railway stations
Railway stations in Great Britain opened in 1854
Railway stations in Great Britain closed in 1956
1854 establishments in England
Tendring
1956 disestablishments in England